Maryland's Legislative District 33 is one of 47 districts in the state for the Maryland General Assembly. It covers part of Anne Arundel County.

Demographic characteristics
As of the 2020 United States census, the district had a population of 141,096, of whom 106,510 (75.5%) were of voting age. The racial makeup of the district was 108,276 (76.7%) White, 11,574 (8.2%) African American, 333 (0.2%) Native American, 6,011 (4.3%) Asian, 99 (0.1%) Pacific Islander, 2,952 (2.1%) from some other race, and 11,879 (8.4%) from two or more races. Hispanic or Latino of any race were 8,717 (6.2%) of the population.

The district had 106,540 registered voters as of October 17, 2020, of whom 24,083 (22.6%) were registered as unaffiliated, 40,568 (38.1%) were registered as Republicans, 40,544 (38.1%) were registered as Democrats, and 601 (0.6%) were registered to other parties.

Political representation
The district is represented for the 2023–2027 legislative term in the State Senate by Dawn Gile (D) and in the House of Delegates by Andrew Pruski (D. District 33A), Stuart Schmidt Jr. (R, District 33B) and Heather Bagnall (D, District 33C).

History
Prior to 2014, the district was bifurcated into two districts: District 33A and District 33B.

Election results

House of Delegates

References

Anne Arundel County, Maryland
33
33